Shaw Lane Association Football Club was a football club based in Barnsley, South Yorkshire. They most recently played in the Northern Premier League Premier Division, at level 7 of the English football league system.

History
Although formed in 2012, the club traces its history to 1991. That year, an U11 team was formed at the Shaw Lane sports complex in Barnsley. The next decade saw the club gradually expand and in 2004 they became part of the Shaw Lane Community Sports Association. The senior team merged with Worsbrough Common F.C. in 2011 to form Aquaforce Barnsley F.C., taking Worsbrough's Sheffield & Hallamshire County Senior League Division One place and winning promotion to the Premier Division in 2012. Aquaforce Barnsley then merged with Barugh F.C., another ailing local team, to form Shaw Lane Aquaforce.

In their first season, the club won the Sheffield and Hallamshire County Senior League Premier Division, winning promotion to the Northern Counties East League (NCEL) Division One. A year later, their rise continued when they finished runners-up in the NCEL Division One, winning promotion to the Premier Division. This was followed by the club winning the Premier Division in the 2014–15 season and gaining promotion to the Northern Premier League (NPL) Division One South.

The club's first season in the NPL ended with a second-place finish, with the team missing out on promotion after losing in the end of season play-offs. In the middle of 2016, the club was renamed as simply Shaw Lane in order to comply with FA regulations which prohibit the use of sponsored names above a certain level. They went on to win the 2016/17 Division One South championship to clinch their fifth promotion in seven years, and completed a league and cup double by beating Frickley Athletic in the final of the Sheffield & Hallamshire Senior Cup to win competition for the first time.

In the 2017-18 season, they reached their 1st FA Cup proper with a 2-1 win over Barrow and lost 1-3 to Mansfield Town.

On 8 June 2018 the club's first team withdrew from football.

Season-by-season record

Notable former players
Players that have played in the Football League or at international level either before or after playing for Shaw Lane Aquaforce –

  Luke O'Brien
 Jason Price
 Steven Istead
 Matt Thornhill
 Neil Austin
 James Cotterill
 Michael Potts
 Rhys Meynell
 Jonathan Wafula
 Jack Tuohy
 David Norris
 Godwin Abadaki
 Jon Stewart
 Aidan Chippendale
 Chib Chilaka
 Matty Templeton
 Gavin Rothery
 Nicky Walker
 Billy Whitehouse
 Paul Ennis
 Adam Priestley

Honours

League
Northern Premier League Division One South 
Champions: 2016-17 
Northern Counties East League Premier Division
Champions: 2014–15
Northern Counties East League Division One
Promoted: 2013–14
Sheffield & Hallamshire County Senior League Premier Division
Champions: 2012–13

Cup
Sheffield & Hallamshire Senior Cup
Winners 2016/17, 2017/18

Records
Best League performance: 6th in Northern Premier League Premier Division, 2017–18
Best FA Cup performance: First Round, 2017–18
Best FA Trophy performance: Third Round Qualifying, 2016–17
Best FA Vase performance: Quarter-final, 2014–15
Record attendance : 1,576 vs. Mansfield Town 2017–18

References

Defunct football clubs in England
Northern Counties East Football League
Association football clubs established in 1991
Defunct football clubs in South Yorkshire
1991 establishments in England
Sport in Barnsley
Sheffield & Hallamshire County Senior Football League
Northern Premier League clubs
Association football clubs disestablished in 2018
2018 disestablishments in England